Mohammad-Hassan Nami is an Iranian military officer. 

He briefly held office as the minister of communication and information technology under Mahmoud Ahmadinejad in 2013.

Nami formerly served as head of the geography organization of the Iranian armed forces, deputy chairperson of joint chiefs-of-staff of Iranian Army and deputy minister of defence and armed forces logistics. He was also the military attaché of the Iranian embassy in Pyongyang, North Korea and holds a doctorate degree in state management from Kim Il Sung University, and one in strategic management.

References

1953 births
Living people
Government ministers of Iran
Islamic Republic of Iran Army brigadier generals
Kim Il-sung University alumni
Islamic Azad University alumni